An epidemic (from Greek ἐπί epi "upon or above" and δῆμος demos "people") is the rapid spread of disease to a large number of hosts in a given population within a short period of time. For example, in meningococcal infections, an attack rate in excess of 15 cases per 100,000 people for two consecutive weeks is considered an epidemic.

Epidemics of infectious disease are generally caused by several factors including a change in the ecology of the host population (e.g., increased stress or increase in the density of a vector species), a genetic change in the pathogen reservoir or the introduction of an emerging pathogen to a host population (by movement of pathogen or host). Generally, an epidemic occurs when host immunity to either an established pathogen or newly emerging novel pathogen is suddenly reduced below that found in the endemic equilibrium and the transmission threshold is exceeded.

An epidemic may be restricted to one location; however, if it spreads to other countries or continents and affects a substantial number of people, it may be termed a pandemic. The declaration of an epidemic usually requires a good understanding of a baseline rate of incidence; epidemics for certain diseases, such as influenza, are defined as reaching some defined increase in incidence above this baseline. A few cases of a very rare disease may be classified as an epidemic, while many cases of a common disease (such as the common cold) would not. An epidemic can cause enormous damage through financial and economic losses in addition to impaired health and loss of life.

Definition
The term epidemic derives from a word form attributed to Homer's Odyssey, which later took its medical meaning from the Epidemics, a treatise by Hippocrates. Before Hippocrates, and other variants had meanings similar to the current definitions of "indigenous" or "endemic". Thucydides' description of the Plague of Athens is considered one of the earliest accounts of a disease epidemic. By the early 17th century, the terms endemic and epidemic referred to contrasting conditions of population-level disease, with the endemic condition at low rates of occurrence and the epidemic condition widespread. The term "epidemic" has become emotionally charged.

The Centers for Disease Control and Prevention defines epidemic broadly: "the occurrence of more cases of disease, injury, or other health condition than expected in a given area or among a specific group of persons during a particular period. Usually, the cases are presumed to have a common cause or to be related to one another in some way (see also outbreak)." The terms "epidemic" and "outbreak" have often been used interchangeably. Researchers Manfred S. Green and colleagues propose that the latter term be restricted to smaller events, pointing out that Chambers Concise Dictionary and Stedman's Medical Dictionary acknowledge this distinction.

Causes

There are several changes that may occur in an infectious agent that may trigger an epidemic. These include:
 Increased virulence
 Introduction into a novel setting
 Changes in host susceptibility to the infectious agent

An epidemic disease is not required to be contagious, and the term has been applied to West Nile fever and the obesity epidemic (e.g., by the World Health Organization), among others.

The conditions which govern the outbreak of epidemics include infected food supplies such as contaminated drinking water and the migration of populations of certain animals, such as rats or mosquitoes, which can act as disease vectors.

Epidemics can be related to seasonality of certain infectious agents. Seasonality may enter into any of the eight key elements of the system: (1) susceptible recruitment via reproduction, (2) transmission, (3) acquired immunity and recovery, (4) waning immunity, (5) natural mortality, (6) symptomatology and pathology (which may be acute or chronic, depending on the disease), (7) disease-induced mortality, and (8) cross-species transmission.  Influenza, the common cold, and other infections of the upper respiratory tract, such as sore throat, occur predominantly in the winter.
There is another variation, both as regards the number of people affected and the number who die in successive epidemics: the severity of successive epidemics rises and falls over periods of five or ten years.

Types

Common source outbreak
In a common source outbreak epidemic, the affected individuals had an exposure to a common agent. If the exposure is singular and all of the affected individuals develop the disease over a single exposure and incubation course, it can be termed a point source outbreak. If the exposure was continuous or variable, it can be termed a continuous outbreak or intermittent outbreak, respectively.

Propagated outbreak
In a propagated outbreak, the disease spreads person-to-person. Affected individuals may become independent reservoirs leading to further exposures.

Many epidemics will have characteristics of both common source and propagated outbreaks (sometimes referred to as mixed outbreak).

For example, secondary person-to-person spread may occur after a common source exposure or an environmental vector may spread a zoonotic diseases agent.

Transmission
 Airborne transmission: Airborne transmission is the spread of infection by droplet nuclei or dust in the air. Without the intervention of winds or drafts the distance over which airborne infection takes place is short, say 10 to 20 feet.
 Arthropod transmission: Arthropod transmission takes place by an insect, either mechanically through a contaminated proboscis or feet, or biologically when there is growth or replication of an organism in the arthropod.
 Biological transmission: Involving a normal biological process, e.g., passing a stage of development of the infecting agent in an intermediate host. Opposite to mechanical transmission.
 Contact transmission: The disease agent is transferred directly by biting, sucking, chewing or indirectly by inhalation of droplets, drinking of contaminated water, traveling in contaminated vehicles.
 Cyclopropagative transmission: The agent undergoes both development and multiplication in the transmitting vehicle.
 Developmental transmission: The agent undergoes some development in the transmission vehicle.
 Fecal-oral transmission: The infectious agent is shed by the infected host in feces and acquired by the susceptible host through the ingestion of contaminated material.
 Horizontal transmission: Lateral spread to others in the same group and at the same time; spread to contemporaries.
 Propagative transmission: The agent multiplies in the transmission vehicle.
 Vertical transmission: From one generation to the next, perhaps transovarially or by intrauterine infection of the fetus. Some retroviruses are transmitted in the germline, i.e. their genetic material is integrated into the DNA of either the ovum or sperm.

Preparation

Preparations for an epidemic include having a disease surveillance system; the ability to quickly dispatch emergency workers, especially local-based emergency workers; and a legitimate way to guarantee the safety and health of health workers.

Effective preparations for a response to a pandemic are multi-layered. The first layer is a disease surveillance system. Tanzania, for example, runs a national lab that runs testing for 200 health sites and tracks the spread of infectious diseases. The next layer is the actual response to an emergency. According to U.S.-based columnist Michael Gerson in 2015, only the U.S. military and NATO have the global capability to respond to such an emergency. Still, despite the most extensive preparatory measures, a fast-spreading pandemic may easily exceed and overwhelm existing health-care resources. Consequently, early and aggressive mitigation efforts, aimed at the so-called "epidemic curve flattening" need to be taken. Such measures usually consist on non-pharmacological interventions such as social/physical distancing, aggressive contact tracing, "stay-at-home" orders, as well as appropriate personal protective equipment (i.e., masks, gloves, and other physical barriers to spread).

See also 

 List of epidemics
 Epidemiology
 Endemic (epidemiology)
 Pandemic
 Syndemic
 European Centre for Disease Prevention and Control
 Center for Disease Control (USA)
 Mathematical modelling of infectious disease
 Epidemic model
 Biosecurity

References

Further reading 

 
 
 Brook, Timothy; et al. "Comparative pandemics: the Tudor–Stuart and Wanli–Chongzhen years of pestilence, 1567–1666" Journal of Global History (2020) 14#3 pp 363–379 emphasis on Chinese history, compared to England
 
 Eisenberg, Merle, and Lee Mordechai. "The Justinianic Plague and Global Pandemics: The Making of the Plague Concept." American Historical Review 125.5 (2020): 1632–1667.
 
 
 
 McKenna, Maryn, "Return of the Germs: For more than a century drugs and vaccines made astounding progress against infectious diseases. Now our best defenses may be social changes", Scientific American, vol. 323, no. 3 (September 2020), pp. 50–56. "What might prevent or lessen [the] possibility [of a virus emerging and finding a favorable human host] is more prosperity more equally distributed – enough that villagers in South Asia need not trap and sell bats to supplement their incomes and that, low-wage workers in the U.S. need not go to work while ill because they have no sick leave." (p. 56.)
 Quammen, David, "The Sobbing Pangolin: How a threatened animal may be linked to the [Covid-19] pandemic's beginnings", The New Yorker, 31 August 2020, pp. 26–31. "More field research is needed [...]. More sampling of wild animals. More scrutiny of genomes. More cognizance of the fact that animal infections can become human infections because humans are animals. We live in a world of viruses, and we have scarcely begun to understand this one [ COVID-19 ]. (p. 31.)

External links 

 
 
 
 
 
 

 
Biological hazards